Palayam or Cantonment, as it is locally known, one of the busiest localities in Thiruvananthapuram (also known as [Trivandrum), the capital of Kerala State in India. It is home to many of the administrative, cultural, and educational institutions in Kerala.

History 
It gets its name from the fact that it used to be camp of the royal army and cavalry of the erstwhile kings of Travancore. It extended from the Cantonment House in the North up to A.K.G. Centre in the South, including areas now occupied by the University Stadium and Chandrasekharan Nair Stadium. The Army subsequently moved to Pangode. The cavalry, however, remained at Palayam.

The name "Cantonment" is not much in use for the area, though that name is still associated with the police station near the Secretariat, "Cantonment Police Station". At present, "Cantonment House" serves as the official residence of the Leader of the Opposition.

Religious confluence 
The Palayam Juma Mosque, St. Joseph's Latin Cathedral or Palayam Palli and a temple dedicated to Lord Ganesh are situated close to each other. The mosque and a temple are side by side, touching each other. The co-existence of these three centres of worship of different religions is quite unique and is a standing example of the religious tolerance and harmony in the state. Today hundreds of devotees offered prayers at the temple. The Friday prayers at the mosque are attended by a fairly high number of people.

St. Joseph's Cathedral is under the Latin Archdiocese of Thiruvananthapuram .

It is a major shopping area of the city. Offices of the University of Kerala, Legislative Assembly, hostel of the Members of the Legislative Assembly, Jubilee Memorial Hospital, Connemara Market and Saphalyam Shopping Complex are at Palayam.

Restaurants serving Arabian cuisine like Shawarma and Kabsa and multi-cuisine ones are many in number.

Connemara Market
Also known as Palayam Market, Connemara Market was established by Lord Connemara, Governor of Madras.  Saphalyam Shopping Complex and many other shops such as Shoe Wagon, Lee are situated here.  Connemara Market is going to be renovated into a big shopping complex and 3-star hotel by next 4 or 5 years.

References

External links

Cantonments of British India
Suburbs of Thiruvananthapuram